The Sistersville Ferry crosses the Ohio River between Sistersville, West Virginia and the unincorporated community of Fly, Ohio.  Known as the oldest ferry in West Virginia, it has been in continuous operation since 1817. It is one of five ferries left on the Ohio River, and the only one along the 277 mi (446 km) stretch of the river on the West Virginia border; the others, located at Augusta, Anderson, Rising Sun and Cave-in-Rock, are all downstream, on the Kentucky portion of the river.

See also
List of crossings of the Ohio River

References

External links
 Sistersville Ferry at Bridges & Tunnels.

Ferries of Ohio
Ferries of West Virginia
Crossings of the Ohio River
Transportation in Monroe County, Ohio
Transportation in Tyler County, West Virginia
1817 establishments in Virginia